Spanning , the  wide Colville Covered Bridge is located along the Colville Pike where it crosses Hinkston Creek about four miles northwest of Millersburg, Kentucky.

The bridge was constructed in 1877 and is one of 13 that remain of more than 400 covered bridges in Kentucky.  The construction architecture is Burr truss consisting of multiple king-posts with panel posts generally spaced 10 feet apart.

A number of reasons have been offered to explain the construction of covered bridges in Kentucky during the 19th century. The protection the cover provided against wood deterioration was likely most important. The  yellow poplar used in the construction was thought - at the time - to be almost indestructible when shielded from the weather.  The cover allowed timbered trusses and braces to season properly and kept water out of the joints, prolonging the life by seven to eight times that of an uncovered bridge.  A second plausible reason is that the boarded sides and shingled roofs prevented horses from seeing the drop to the water below and becoming "spooked". "

References

Transportation in Bourbon County, Kentucky
Covered bridges on the National Register of Historic Places in Kentucky
Wooden bridges in Kentucky
National Register of Historic Places in Bourbon County, Kentucky
Road bridges on the National Register of Historic Places in Kentucky
Burr Truss bridges in the United States
Bridges completed in 1877
1877 establishments in Kentucky